EliteXC: Return of the King was a mixed martial arts event promoted by EliteXC that took place on Saturday, June 14, 2008 at the Neal S. Blaisdell Arena in Honolulu, Hawaii.

Background
The main card aired live on Showtime and drew an estimated 350,000 viewers.

A Welterweight title bout between champion Jake Shields and Drew Fickett was removed from the original card when Fickett sustained an injury.

Nick Diaz showed up for his 160-pound lightweight fight at 169 pounds which led to it becoming a catchweight bout.

Results

See also 
 Elite Xtreme Combat
 2008 in Elite Xtreme Combat

References

External links
Official EliteXC site

Return of the King
2008 in mixed martial arts
Mixed martial arts in Hawaii
Sports in Honolulu
2008 in sports in Hawaii